Sweden Sans is a sans-serif typeface developed by Söderhavet design agency for exclusive use by Swedish government ministries, agencies and corporations.

More information and download links are at the official website.

References

Government typefaces
Typefaces and fonts introduced in 2014